The Charleston RiverDogs are a Minor League Baseball team of the Carolina League. They are located in Charleston, South Carolina, and are the Single-A affiliate of the Tampa Bay Rays. The RiverDogs' home stadium is Joseph P. Riley Jr. Park.

History

Early success as the Royals 
The RiverDogs were founded in 1980 as the Charleston Royals and were a farm team of the Kansas City Royals. In their first season as the Royals, they won the South Atlantic League's Southern Division championship, but fell in the playoffs against Greensboro. Like the Pirates, the Royals were known for their pitching, because in 1981 pitcher Jeffery Gladden led the league with a 2.09 ERA. In 1982 batting may have caught up with the pitching as pitcher Danny Jackson led the league with a 10–1 record and slugger Cliff Pastornicky paced the South Atlantic League with a .343 batting average. In 1983 Mark Pirruccello set a single-season team record with 25 home runs. 1984 was an exciting season for Charleston as the city hosted the all-star game in which Tom Glavine and Pat Borders played. On the field the Royals went on to win the Southern Division and Kevin Seitzer was named league MVP.

Rainbows era 
In 1985, the team was renamed the Charleston Rainbows and became affiliated with the San Diego Padres. From 1985 to 1987 were the building years as the Rainbows improved each season under a great pitching staff until 1988 when they won the Southern Division title but were bounced in the first round of the playoffs. The 1988 season was powered by a pitching staff whose combined ERA equaled 2.07. 1988 was the last of the "good ol' days", because starting in 1989 the team suffered 11 consecutive losing seasons. Poor play on the field translated into a South Atlantic League record, when in 1990 pitcher Charles Thompson registered 17 losses. In 1994 the team was renamed Charleston RiverDogs. Despite the name change, the losing continued. In 1997 saw the RiverDogs leave the 84-year-old College Park and move into the brand-new 5,500-seat Joseph P. Riley Jr. Park. The team also began its eight-year affiliation with the Tampa Bay Rays in 1997. The move to the "Joe" helped to spur a rise in total attendance, as the team set a record with an increase in over 100,000 fans. In 1998, the RiverDogs were the first professional baseball team to broadcast live video on the internet, and the first team to broadcast video of their entire home season.

Finally, in 2000 the 'Dogs posted their first winning season since 1988.

Return to the playoffs 
In 2003 saw the beginning of a new era as the RiverDogs played well on the field and posted a winning season for the first time since 2000. In 2004 the RiverDogs secured the wildcard spot in the playoffs bringing Charleston a playoff series for the first time in 16 years. Charleston faced the hated rival Capital City in the first round but were swept two games to none. The RiverDogs became the Class Single-A affiliate of the New York Yankees on September 15, 2004. 2005 was another great season as the Riverdogs jumped out winning the first-half Southern Division Championship qualifying them for the playoffs for the first consecutive seasons in franchise history. The 2005 playoffs weren't as good to the RiverDogs as fans had hoped, because the RiverDogs fell to eventual champion the Kannapolis Intimidators two games to none. At the end of the 2005 season, Charleston was making an attempt to attract a Class Double-A team by expanding their stadium by a few hundred seats. 2006 saw a good performance on the field, but no playoffs as the RiverDogs posted a 78–62 record. 2007 saw a record year for winning seasons when they finished the season with a 78–62 record and securing their fifth consecutive winning season tying a Charleston professional baseball record with the Sea Gulls (1914–1917, 1919) (No team in 1918). A downside to the record tying season was that the 'Dogs failed to make the playoffs for the second straight season. 2008 brought a memorable year to Charleston, as the Riverdogs recorded their final record at 80–59 bringing their sixth consecutive winning season, breaking a record for the most consecutive winning seasons (a record that stood since 1919) in Charleston baseball history. The downside to 2008 was the third straight season the Riverdogs failed to make the playoffs – despite having the best record in the Southern Division each season, they never held the division lead at the end of a half-season to claim a playoff spot. The 2009 season saw the Riverdogs finish with a winning record again. In the first half the Riverdogs came up a game short to their arch-rival Greenville Drive, who are affiliated to the Boston Red Sox and never posed as a threat in the second half failing to make the playoffs for the fourth straight year.

Colbrunn era 
After posting a 232–186 record, Riverdogs manager Torre Tyson was named the Tampa Yankees manager in High A baseball. The RiverDogs were quick to name hitting coach Greg Colbrunn as the new manager for the 2010 season. With the RiverDogs on the verge of making the playoffs each of the last four seasons, expectations were high for Colbrunn.

The day following the 2015 Charleston church shooting, the RiverDogs decided to proceed with their regularly scheduled game, with Dave Echols, the team's general manager, saying: "We feel it is our duty not to let the acts of one radical human being dictate our lives". The RiverDogs donated the proceeds of the night's game to the charity set up for the Emanuel African Methodist Episcopal Church.

2021 restructuring
On November 7, 2020, the Yankees announced that Charleston would not be part of their minor league organization under the restructuring of Minor League Baseball for 2021. Instead, they were organized into the Low-A East as the Low-A affiliate of the Tampa Bay Rays. In 2022, the Low-A East became known as the Carolina League, the name historically used by the regional circuit prior to the 2021 reorganization.

Before the Riverdogs

Seagulls, Sea Gulls, and Gulls 
Baseball has a long history in the Palmetto State dating back to 1862. Union soldiers from the 165th New York Infantry competed against soldiers of the 47th and 48th New York Infantries on Christmas Day 1862.

After the Civil War the game of baseball exploded in Charleston. From 1866 to 1886 the Holy City would be home to over 100 individual black and white baseball clubs.

The first organized team in Charleston was the Palmetto Baseball Club of Charleston with Mr. A.W. Wardell selected as president. The first official game took place at the Citadel Green (Marion Square) on May 23, 1866, when the club split into separate teams to play.

The Charleston Seagulls became the first professional baseball team to play in Charleston. The team was part of the newly formed Southern League and had a 22-man roster. The Seagulls first game was an exhibition game against the Louisville Colonels of the America Association on March 16, 1886. This was the first game ever to be played on their newly constructed "Ball Park Field" located at the corner of Meeting Street and Shepherd Street. The Seagulls ended up losing 5 to 7.

The first official Southern League game took place on April 15, 1886, against the 1885 Southern League Champions, the Atlanta Atlantas. The Seagulls would lose this game as well 4 to 6.

The 1886 season ended after the earthquake that occurred on August 31. The Seagulls would finish just under 50% with a 44–49 record.

Palmettos and Pals 
Starting in 1920, the Gulls became the Palmettos, however, later that year that name was shortened to the Pals while Charleston was promoted to "Class B". In 1922, the Pals created excitement around Charleston as they won the South Atlantic League title, but due to unknown reasons the Pals folded at the end of the season, and that lead to a 16-year baseball drought in Charleston.

Rebels 
Finally in 1940, a new team began play in the South Atlantic League known as the Charleston Rebels. Just two years later, in 1942, the Rebels won the South Atlantic League Championship ending a 20-year championship drought. However, the next year, the Rebels posted a losing record. 1947 started out with a bang as the Rebels were promoted to Class A and drew 184,851 fans in the season, a Charleston baseball record that stood until 1997. After all the excitement from the 1947 season, the Rebels went out and won the South Atlantic League Championship for the second time in seven years in 1948, the last time Charleston won a championship. After that memorable season, the Rebels declined and couldn't post a winning season. With fans losing interest the Rebels folded at the end of the 1953 season.

ChaSox and White Sox experiment with affiliation 
In 1959, baseball returned to Charleston, but this time the team was affiliated with a Major League Baseball Team, the Chicago White Sox. The experiment failed horribly as attendance was down by more than 50% and the White Sox failed to post consecutive winning seasons.

New team, new league 
In 1973, the Charleston Pirates were born, who were affiliated with the Pittsburgh Pirates, and for the first time since 1893 were playing in a league other than the South Atlantic League, they were in the Western Carolinas League. As the Pirates, Charleston excelled in pitching as in 1973 John Candelaria led the league with a 10–2 record. The following year, the Pirates pitcher Randy Sealy set a team record with a 1.97 ERA. However, after those promising years, the Pirates set a league record by losing 22 straight games. In 1976 and 1977, the Pirates became the Patriots, but the name change still had no effect on the team's play as the team failed to post a winning record and watched attendance plunge. Finally, in 1978 the Pirates left town.

Season-by-season records 

|-
| 1980 (Royals) || 78 || 61 || Southern Division Champions || WON First Round (Spartanburg), 2–0Lost SAL Championship Series (Greensboro), 1–3
|-
| 1981 (Royals) || 75 || 67 || 2nd Southern Division || Did Not Qualify
|-
| 1982 (Royals) || 74 || 66 || 2nd Southern Division || Lost First Round (Florence) 0-2
|-
| 1983 (Royals) || 64 || 80 || 5th Southern Division || Did Not Qualify
|-
| 1984 (Royals) || 78 || 64 || First Half Southern Division Champions || WON First Round (Columbia), 3–1 Lost SAL Championship Series (Asheville), 2–3
|-
| 1985 (Rainbows) || 63 || 69 || 3rd Southern Division || Did Not Qualify
|-
| 1986 (Rainbows) || 68 || 71 || 3rd Southern Division || Did Not Qualify
|-
| 1987 (Rainbows) || 85 || 53 || 5th Southern Division || Did Not Qualify
|-
| 1988 (Rainbows) || 72 || 68 || Southern Division Champions || WON First Round (Myrtle Beach), 3–1 Lost SAL Championship Series (Spartanburg), 0–3
|-
| 1989 (Rainbows) || 46 || 96 || 3rd Southern Division || Lost First Round (Augusta), 0–3
|-
| 1990 (Rainbows) || 69 || 72 || 6th Southern Division || Did Not Qualify
|-
| 1991 (Rainbows) || 55 || 85 || 4th Southern Division || Did Not Qualify
|-
| 1992 (Rainbows) || 55 || 85 || 7th Southern Division || Did Not Qualify
|-
| 1993 (Rainbows) || 66 || 70 || 5th Southern Division || Did Not Qualify
|-
| 1994 (RiverDogs) || 50 || 89 || 6th Southern Division || Did Not Qualify
|-
| 1995 (RiverDogs) || 50 || 89 || 7th Southern Division || Did Not Qualify
|-
| 1996 (RiverDogs) || 63 || 78 || 4th Central Division || Did Not Qualify
|-
| 1997 (RiverDogs) || 60 || 82 || 6th Central Division || Did Not Qualify
|-
| 1998 (RiverDogs) || 67 || 74 || 5th Central Division || Did Not Qualify
|-
| 1999 (RiverDogs) || 65 || 77 || 5th Central Division || Did Not Qualify
|-
| 2000 (RiverDogs) || 73 || 66 || 3rd Central Division || Did Not Qualify
|-
| 2001 (RiverDogs) || 64 || 76 || 7th Southern Division || Did Not Qualify
|-
| 2002 (RiverDogs) || 60 || 76 || 7th Southern Division || Did Not Qualify
|-
| 2003 (RiverDogs) || 77 || 62 || 3rd Southern Division || Did Not Qualify
|-
| 2004 (RiverDogs) || 76 || 63 || 2nd Southern Division || Lost First Round (Capital City), 0–2
|-
| 2005 (RiverDogs) || 80 || 58 || Southern Division Champions || Lost First Round (Kannapolis), 0–2
|-
| 2006 (RiverDogs) || 78 || 62 || 2nd Southern Division || Did Not Qualify
|-
| 2007 (RiverDogs) || 78 || 62 || 4th Southern Division || Did Not Qualify
|-
| 2008 (RiverDogs) || 80 || 59 || Southern Division Champions || Did Not Qualify (Were not leading division at the end of each half season)
|-
| 2009 (RiverDogs) || 74 || 65 || 2nd Southern Division || Did Not Qualify
|-
| 2010 (RiverDogs) || 65 || 74 || 6th Southern Division || Did Not Qualify
|-
| 2011 (RiverDogs) || 55 || 85 || 6th Southern Division || Did Not Qualify
|-
| 2012 (RiverDogs) || 76 || 63 || 2nd Southern Division || Did Not Qualify
|-
| 2013 (RiverDogs) || 75 || 63 || 3rd Southern Division || Did Not Qualify
|-
| 2014 (RiverDogs) || 71 || 69 || 3rd Southern Division || Did Not Qualify
|-
| 2015 (RiverDogs) || 66 || 74 || 4th Southern Division || Did Not Qualify
|-
| 2016 (RiverDogs) || 76 || 63 || 2nd Southern Division || Lost First Round (Rome), 1-2
|-
| 2017 (RiverDogs) || 76 || 63 || 2nd Southern Division || Lost First Round (Greenville), 1-2
|-
| 2018 (RiverDogs) || 64 || 72 || 5th Southern Division || Did Not Qualify
|-
| 2019 (RiverDogs) || 73 || 66 || 2nd Southern Division || Did Not Qualify
|-
| 2021 (RiverDogs) || 82 || 38 ||  Southern Division Champions ||  Won Finals (Down East), 3-2
|-
| 2022 (RiverDogs) || 88 || 44 ||  Southern Division Champions ||  Won Finals (Bank of the James Stadium, Lynchburg, Virginia), 2-0
|-
| Overall (Regular Season) || 2910 || 2919 ||  ||
|-
| Overall (Playoffs) || 20 || 26 ||  ||
|-
| Overall || 2930 || 2945 ||  ||

Roster

Notable players 
A number of ex-RiverDogs have gone on to make a name for themselves in Major League Baseball, including: B. J. Upton, Carl Crawford, Rocco Baldelli, Delmon Young, Seth McClung, Josh Hamilton, Toby Hall, Aubrey Huff, and Fernando Tatís who all played for the RiverDogs; Sandy Alomar Jr., Roberto Alomar, and Carlos Baerga who all played for the Rainbows; and David Cone and John Candelaria who played for the Royals and Pirates, respectively.

Aaron Judge, Danny Burawa, Phil Hughes, David Robertson, Gary Sánchez, Austin Jackson, John Axford, Eduardo Núñez, and Phil Coke have also played for the RiverDogs more recently.

References

External links 
 
 Statistics from Baseball-Reference
 http://www.charlestonrainbows.com

1980 establishments in South Carolina
Baseball teams established in 1980
Defunct South Atlantic League teams
Kansas City Royals minor league affiliates
New York Yankees minor league affiliates
Professional baseball teams in South Carolina
San Diego Padres minor league affiliates
Sports in Charleston, South Carolina
Tampa Bay Devil Rays minor league affiliates
Tampa Bay Rays minor league affiliates
Texas Rangers minor league affiliates
Carolina League teams